All Stretton is a civil parish in Shropshire, England.  The parish contains two listed buildings that are recorded in the National Heritage List for England.  Both the listed buildings are designated at Grade II, the lowest of the three grades, which is applied to "buildings of national importance and special interest".      The parish contains the village of All Stretton, and is otherwise entirely rural, and the listed buildings consist of a farmhouse and a milestone


Buildings

References

Citations

Sources

Lists of buildings and structures in Shropshire